Derry Mathews (born 23 September 1983) is a British former professional boxer who competed from 2003 to 2017. He held the WBA interim lightweight title in 2015 and has challenged, twice, for lightweight world championships, the WBO title in 2016, and the vacant IBO title in 2012. At regional level, he held the British lightweight title twice between 2012 and 2014, the Commonwealth lightweight title in 2013, and challenged, twice, for the EBU European lightweight title between 2011 and 2012.

Amateur career
Mathews won the 2002 Amateur Boxing Association British bantamweight title, when boxing out of the Salisbury ABC.

Professional career
Mathews shot to notice in October 2006 when he defeated Stephen Foster to win the WBU featherweight title which announced Mathews onto the domestic scene.  Successful defences of the title followed against John Simpson and Matthew Marsh before running into the Mongolian Choi Tseveenpurev in Bolton on 5 April 2008. Mathews hit the deck three times before finally being hit with a body shot that ended the fight on the bell to end the fifth round. After the defeat to Tseveenpurev, Mathews came back to beat the Kenyan, John Gircharu over eight rounds in his home city of Liverpool showing that the defeat had not destroyed his confidence.

Signing for Hayemaker
In August 2008, Mathews decided to split from the Frank Warren boxing stable and took the decision to join the newly formed Hayemaker Promotions. On speaking about the deal Mathews said; "The deal is unbelievable and Hayemaker Promotions are going to bring big things for me" He was knocked out in the 9th round of his first fight with the fledgling promotional outfit. The fight against Martin Lindsay was on the undercard to Ryan Rhodes defence of his British light-middleweight title. Mathews had put Lindsay down in the 2nd round and was ahead on points, until a knockout brought any aspirations that Mathews may have had of fighting for the British title down.  Mathews second fight with Hayemaker in March 2009 took place in his home town of Liverpool. It also ended in disappointment as he suffered a stoppage defeat to Harry Ramogoadi.  Following the collapse of Setanta Sports and the loss of Hayemakers television deal, Mathews split from the promoter saying "It’s a shame but after the TV went the shows dried up. I have left on good terms though and have no issues with anybody at Hayemaker, but I have to look after my own career."

Hatton Promotions
Mathews signed for Hatton Promotions following the collapse of his deal with Hayemaker, making his debut on 13 November 2009. Fighting in Stoke on the Matthew Hatton versus Lovemore N'dou undercard, Mathews challenged local man Scott Lawton only to lose in the sixth round after the referee deemed Mathews unfit to continue.  The defeat to Lawton represented Mathew's fourth defeat in five matches.  On 17 July 2010 he returned to winning ways defeating journeyman Kristian Laight at the Fit City in Salford and followed the victory up with another win over Daniel Thorpe at the same venue on 25 September 2010.

Prizefighter tournament
On 20 November 2010 Mathews entered the super featherweight installment of the Prizefighter series saying that he wanted to make the most of the opportunity.  Amongst the other contestants in the tournament were two fighters he had previously lost to in Scott Lawton and Choi Tseveenpurev with Mathews saying "I want Choi up first to prove to myself and to other people that I can beat him. When I lost my world title to him I was only 22, I was only a boy, but I’m now a man and have learnt the hard way coming off a few defeats."  In the draw for the tournament Mathews took on Gary McArthur in the quarter finals, stopping him in the third round before meeting Choi in the semi-final with Mathews gaining a revenge victory in a close fought fight.  Reaching the final Mathews met Gary Buckland only to lose with a second round stoppage.  Speaking following the tournament Mathews described his performance against Choi as a "real war" and said of his opponent in the final, "Gary is a deserved winner but after how I performed tonight, I know I have more to offer the game."

Comeback
On 22 January 2011 Mathews made a comeback under the guidance of Liverpool Boxing Promoter Stephen Vaughan Jnr and challenged Scott Lawton once more, this time at the Olympia in Liverpool gaining a revenge win over the man from Stoke to lift the IBO International title at lightweight.  Winning on all three of the judges scorecards, the fight went the full 12 rounds with Mathews dominating the first 8 rounds only for Lawton to come back into the fight towards the end culminating in a final round tear up.  Mathews followed the win up with a challenge for the English lightweight title beating Amir Unsworth with a 1st round stoppage again at the Olympia on 2 April 2011.  Two more stoppage victories following against George Watson and Stephen Jennings. The latter for the British Masters lightweight title. He then challenged Gavin Rees for the European Boxing Union European Title which ended in a draw because of a head collision.  On 20 January 2012, almost a year on from his comeback, he challenged Emiliano Marsili for the vacant IBO World lightweight title.  The fight with Marsili ended in round 7 with Mathews being stopped on his feet. He then challenged then British champion Anthony Crolla on 21 April 2012 and won with a sixth round stoppage winning the British title for the first time in his career.  After this impressive win to capture the British Title he challenged Gavin Rees again for the EBU European title on 7 July 2012 which ended in a ninth round stoppage in favor of Rees.  After this he left Stephen Vaughan Jnr entered prizefighter for the second time which ended in a Semi Final defeat to Terry Flanighan and signed a Promotional deal with Dave Coldwell.

A win on a Coldwell promotion on 7 December 2012 against journeyman Asan Yuseinov set up a return match up with Anthony Crolla for the vacant Commonwealth lightweight title in Liverpool Echo Arena on 30 March 2013 which ended in a draw although most seen Crolla as the Winner.  After this on 13 July 2013 he won the Vacant Commonwealth title with a sensational KO of Tommy Coyle in the 10th Round outdoors at Craven Park Stadium Hull.
Mathews subsequently defeated Curtis Woodhouse by way of a third round ok to retain his Commonwealth title in Liverpool Olympia on 21 September 2013.  In October 2013 he announced a split from Dave Coldwell and signed an agreement with Frank Warren to box on his BoxNation Channel. In his 1st fight back under the Warren banner he was out pointed easily by Irishman Stephen Ormond for the WBO European title on 7 December 2013.

On 10 May 2014 he won the British lightweight  Title for the second time by out pointing Martin Gethin over 12 Rounds at the Liverpool Olympia.  He subsequently relinquished the title for Terry Flanighan to challenge Martin Gethin for the vacant Title In Manchester a couple of months later.

After threecomeback wins in a row, Mathews managed to secure a shot at the WBO lightweight title, fighting Terry Flanagan for the title. Mathews lost the fight convicingly, via unanimous decision, as Flanagan defended his belt successfully for the second time in a row.

In his next fight, Mathews faced former British Olympian Luke Campbell. Campbell managed to land numerous body shots on Mathews, which culminated in a fourth-round knockout for Campbell.

On 5 March 2017 he announced his retirement from boxing following a 3rd round stoppage against Ohara Davies the night before.

Professional boxing record

References

External links
 
 Profile at BritishBoxing.net
Derry Mathews - Profile, News Archive & Current Rankings at Box.Live

|-

1983 births
Living people
English male boxers
Prizefighter contestants
Boxers from Liverpool
Featherweight boxers